Bertrand of Orléans-Braganza (born Bertrand Maria José Pio Januário Miguel Gabriel Raphael Gonzaga de Orléans e Bragança; 2 February 1941, in Mandelieu-la-Napoule, Vichy France) is the head of the Vassouras branch of the House of Orléans-Braganza and one of two claimants to the defunct Brazilian throne. He succeeded his brother Luiz of Orléans-Braganza to the claim on 15 July 2022. The Vassouras branch claims the throne in opposition to the Petrópolis branch of the Orléans-Braganzas, headed by Pedro Carlos Orléans-Braganza. Although Bertrand and Pedro Carlos respectively  were and are great-grandchildren of Isabel, Princess Imperial (daughter of Emperor Pedro II), of the House of Braganza, they disputed leadership over the Brazilian Imperial Family due to a dynastic dispute concerning their fathers, who were cousins.

Biography

Early life

The third son of Pedro Henrique of Orléans-Braganza and Princess Maria Elisabeth of Bavaria, his elder brothers are, in order, Luiz of Orléans-Braganza who claimed to be Head of the Brazilian Imperial Family until 2022 and Eudes of Orléans-Braganza, who renounced his dynastic rights to the Brazilian throne in order to marry a commoner.

As with his two elder brothers, Bertrand was born in southern France, 1941, even though the exile imposed on the family had already been revoked, in 1920, due to the Second World War. He came to Brazil after the end of the conflict.

In Brazil, the family settled first in the Grão-Pará Palace in the state of Rio de Janeiro, where he carried out part of his secondary studies in the Jesuit St. Ignatius College. Later his family moved to Paraná, where his father bought a farm and Bertrand spent his childhood. When he was 18 years old, he went to São Paulo, where he achieved a bachelor's degree in Law from the Faculty of Law of the University of São Paulo in 1964. He still lives in São Paulo.

Education and beliefs

From a very young age he received Catholic formation, being guided by his father to the taste for the doctrinal study and the analysis of the national and international events. He participated with enthusiasm in the academic banks of the ideological struggles that marked Brazil in the first half of the sixties. His formation was completed with frequent trips to Europe, one of which took place during the entire First Session of the Second Vatican Council, when he took close contact with the Catholic intelligentsia to Rome for the great event. Civil pilot, is a reservist of the Brazilian Air Force.

Bertrand is a Traditionalist Catholic and a member of Tradition, Family and Property, of traditionalist Catholic inspiration, founded and directed by the intellectual leader Plinio Corrêa de Oliveira until his death. There it diffuses from the catholic and monarchical ideals, seen by him as "distinct and harmonious facets of the same ideal." His older brother, Luiz, was also part of the organization. After a spin-off occurred in the entity, he and his brother began to collaborate with members linked to the Plinio Corrêa de Oliveira Institute (IPCO) and the Founders' Association.

Besides Portuguese, his native language, Bertrand is fluent in French and Spanish.

Later life

He is not married and has no issue, so his dynastic heir is his younger brother, Antonio of Orléans-Braganza, who is married to a Belgian aristocrat, Princess Christine of Ligne, with issue.

Both he and his elder brother, Luiz, were engaged in monarchist proselytism in Brazil. They both played main roles during the campaign for the 1993 plebiscite, which represented the hitherto only real opportunity for a return of the monarchy since the proclamation of the republic, in 1889. In it, the people were asked to choose which form of government (presidential or parliamentary) and which form of state organization (republic or constitutional monarchy) Brazil should have. The monarchist cause was not successful, receiving only 13.4% of the vote.

Roles
In recent years, Bertrand is coordinator and spokesman of the movement Paz no Campo (Peace in the fields), and has traveled all over Brazil lecturing for farmers and entrepreneurs in defense of private property and free enterprise. 

As the activist and spokesman of the Brazilian Imperial House for the restoration of the monarchy, Bertrand has gained prominence in the national media and, on some occasions, international media, with the rise and spread of monarchist movements throughout the country. He participates annually in public meetings with monarchists, in addition to attending other meetings and conducting lectures, often at the invitation of private institutions, municipal governments and legislative assemblies, mainly for public events related to Brazil's monarchical past. In 2016 he gave an interview to Mariana Godoy on her program on RedeTV!, gaining notoriety with the general public. On 22 September 2017 Bertrand participated in the program The Noite com Danilo Gentili, currently the largest talk show in the country, breaking the program's record of audience. Despite the campaign, politically the monarchist movement is still small, with 11% of support among the population, according to a survey.

Political opinions 
Bertrand supports typically conservative ideas: he opposes same-sex marriage, favours the illegality of abortion in all cases and is against the demarcation of indigenous territory in Brazil. He has also criticised the progressivism of Pope Francis, although he does recognize him as the legitimate pope.

He is a climate change denialist and published a book entitled "Psicose Ambientalista" ("Environmental Psychosis"), dealing with what he calls "the hoaxes created by radical environmentalists and by eco-terrorists".

Honours 
As Head of the Brazilian Imperial Family, Bertrand claims the following positions:
  Grand Master and Sovereign of the Imperial Order of Christ
  Grand Master and Sovereign of the Imperial Order of Saint Benedict of Aviz
  Grand Master and Sovereign of the Imperial Order of Saint James of the Sword
  Grand Master and Sovereign of the Imperial Order of the Southern Cross
  Grand Master and Sovereign of the Imperial Order of Emperor Pedro I
  Grand Master and Sovereign of the Imperial Order of the Rose

Bertrand has also received other honours:
  Bailiff Grand Cross of Honour and Devotion of the Sovereign Military Order of Malta
  Knight of the Order of the Holy Sepulchre
  Bailiff Grand Cross of the Sacred Military Constantinian Order of Saint George
   Grand Cross of the Order of the Immaculate Conception of Vila Viçosa
   Commander of the Order of Military Merit (Brazil) (2013)
  Medal of Honor (Special Class) of the Association of Monarchic Autarchs of Portugal

Ancestry

References

External links 

 Dom Bertrand, Facebook.
 "Herdeiros do Porvir", imperial magazine, number 32, 2013.
 "Príncipe imperial defende monarquia em MG e afirma que homossexualidade é um 'defeito'", Sul de Minas EPTV, 2017.

|-

1941 births
Living people
Brazilian people of Portuguese descent
Brazilian traditionalist Catholics
Bertrand of Orleans-Braganza
Brazilian Roman Catholics
People from São Paulo
University of São Paulo alumni
Conservatism in Brazil
Heads of the Imperial House of Brazil
Tradition, Family, Property